House Party is the fourteenth album by American jazz organist Jimmy Smith featuring performances recorded in 1957 and 1958 and released on the Blue Note label. The album was rereleased on CD with one bonus track.

Background
Blue Note used the Manhattan Towers Hotel Ballroom in New York City for recording sessions in 1957-1958, while their recording engineer Rudy Van Gelder was still using his parents' Hackensack, N.J. home studio to record artists. House Party was the first of two Smith albums recorded on two dates, the second was Smith's next album The Sermon!, released in 1959. Blue Note mainly used the Manhattan Towers ballroom for larger groups of musicians, or when New York was a more convenient location to record the artists involved.

Reception
The Allmusic review by Lindsay Planer awarded the album 4 stars stating

Track listing
 "Au Privave" (Charlie Parker) – 15:09
 "Lover Man" (Jimmy Davis, Ram Ramirez, James Sherman) – 7:00
 "Just Friends" (John Klenner, Sam M. Lewis) – 15:15
 "Blues After All" (Kenny Burrell) – 6:06

Bonus track on 1987 CD reissue
 "Confirmation" (Parker) – 10:34
Recorded at Manhattan Towers in New York City on August 25, 1957 (tracks 3 & 4) and February 25, 1958 (tracks 1, 2 & 5)

Personnel

Musicians
 Jimmy Smith – organ
 Lee Morgan – trumpet (tracks 1, 3, 4 & 5)
 Curtis Fuller – trombone (tracks 3 & 4)
 George Coleman – alto saxophone, (tracks 3 & 4)
 Lou Donaldson – alto saxophone, (tracks 1, 2 & 5)
 Tina Brooks – tenor saxophone (tracks 1 & 5)
 Kenny Burrell  – guitar, (tracks 1, 4 & 5)
 Eddie McFadden – guitar, (track 2 & 3)
 Donald Bailey – drums, (tracks 2, 3 & 4)
 Art Blakey – drums, (tracks 1 & 5)

Technical
 Alfred Lion – producer
 Rudy Van Gelder – engineer
 Reid Miles – design
 Francis Wolff – photography
 Robert Levin – liner notes

References

1958 albums
Blue Note Records albums
Jimmy Smith (musician) albums
Albums produced by Alfred Lion